Judah and 9th Avenue is a light rail stop on the Muni Metro N Judah line, located in the Sunset District neighborhood of San Francisco, California. The station opened with the N Judah line on October 21, 1928. The station has two side platforms in the middle of Judah Street (traffic islands) where passengers board or depart from trains. The station also has mini-high platforms providing access to people with disabilities.

In March 2014, Muni released details of the proposed implementation of their Transit Effectiveness Project (later rebranded MuniForward), which included a variety of stop changes for the N Judah line. Under that plan – which will be implemented as the N Judah Rapid Project – Judah and 9th Avenue will be one of the only stops on the line without significant changes, as its boarding islands are already long enough to accommodate a full train.

References

External links 

SFMTA – Judah and 9th Avenue eastbound and westbound
SFBay Transit (unofficial) – Judah St & 9th Ave

Muni Metro stations
Sunset District, San Francisco
Railway stations in the United States opened in 1928